La baie du désir (also known as, The Erotic Touch) is a 1964 French erotic drama film directed by Max Pécas and Radley Metzger (uncredited).

Plot
A young couple becomes entangled with a younger woman, resulting in tragic consequences.

Cast 
 Fabienne Dali ... Greta / La maitresse / la femme
 Sophie Hardy ... Mathias / La cousine
 Jean Valmont ... Claude / L'amant de Fabienne
 François Dyrek ... The father/ Le braconnier

Notes
According to one film reviewer, Radley Metzger's films, including those made during the Golden Age of Porn (1969–1984), are noted for their "lavish design, witty screenplays, and a penchant for the unusual camera angle". Another reviewer noted that his films were "highly artistic — and often cerebral ... and often featured gorgeous cinematography". Film and audio works by Metzger have been added to the permanent collection of the Museum of Modern Art (MoMA) in New York City.

References

Further reading
 Cahiers du cinéma, nº 161-162, janvier 1965
 Jheronym Potocki, Positif, nº 66, janvier 1965, 
 Jacques Chevallier, La Saison cinématographique 65, janvier 1966,

External links
 
 La baie du désir on Letterboxd
 La baie du désir on Ciné-Ressources
 

French erotic drama films
Films directed by Radley Metzger
1964 films
1960s erotic drama films
1964 drama films
1960s French-language films
1960s French films